Municipal elections were held in the Canadian province of Prince Edward Island on November 7, 2022.

Charlottetown

Mayor
The results for mayor of Charlottetown were as follows:

City Council
Results for Charlottetown City Council were as follows:

Cornwall

Mayor
Cornwall mayor Minerva McCourt was re-elected as mayor of Cornwall by acclamation:

Stratford
The results for mayor of Stratford are as follows:

Mayor

Summerside
The results for mayor of Summerside are as follows:

Mayor

Three Rivers
The results for mayor of Three Rivers were as follows:

Mayor

References

External links
Results

Elections in Prince Edward Island
2022 elections in Canada
Municipal elections in Prince Edward Island
November 2022 events in Canada